DeWitt is the second largest city in Arkansas County, Arkansas, United States, which also serves as the county seat of the southern district of Arkansas County. Population was 3,292 at the time of the 2010 census. The city is located on the Arkansas Grand Prairie, known for rice farming and duck hunting. DeWitt is home to the DeWitt School District and the DeWitt Municipal Airport.

History
The Arkansas County Quorum Court determined Arkansas Post, which had served as county seat since 1813, was no longer centrally located within the county following creation of several Southeast Arkansas counties. A new, more centrally located town was proposed to become county seat. Founded February 19, 1853, the name DeWitt was picked out of a hat after being submitted by an admirer of the sixth governor of New York, DeWitt Clinton, one of many localities named for Clinton during the period. The town was platted in 1854, and has had a post office since 1856. The city was incorporated in 1875.

Geography 
DeWitt and Arkansas County are located in the Arkansas Delta (in Arkansas, usually referred to as "the Delta") a subregion of the Mississippi Alluvial Plain, which is a flat area consisting of rich, fertile sediment deposits from the Mississippi River between Louisiana and Illinois.

Within the Delta, Arkansas County is almost entirely within the Grand Prairie subregion, historically a flat grassland plain underlain by an impermeable clay layer (the Stuttgart soil series). Prior to the 19th century, flatter areas with slowly to very slowly permeable soils (often containing fragipans) supported Arkansas's largest prairie, covered in prairie grasses and forbs, with oaks covering the low hills and ridges, and pockets of floodplains with bottomland hardwood forests. This region was a sharp contrast to the bottomland forests that once dominated other parts of the Mississippi Alluvial Plain. Cropland has now largely replaced the native vegetation. Distinctively, rice is the main crop; soybeans, cotton, corn, and wheat are also grown. The rice fields provide habitat and forage for large numbers and many species of waterfowl; duck and goose hunting occurs at this important spot along the Mississippi Flyway.

DeWitt is located at  (34.291477, -91.336983).

Demographics

2020 census

As of the 2020 United States census, there were 3,056 people, 1,226 households, and 730 families residing in the city.

2010 census
As of the 2010 United States Census, there were 3,292 people living in the city. 74.5% were White, 21.4% African American, 0.3% Native American, 0.4% Asian, 2.1% from some other race and 1.4% from two or more races. 3.2% were Hispanic or Latino of any race.

2000 census
As of the census of 2000, there were 3,552 people, 1,419 households, and 977 families living in the city. The racial makeup of the city was 77.93% White, 20.92% Black or African American, 0.17% Native American, 0.23% Asian, 0.20% from other races, and 0.56% from two or more races.  0.53% of the population were Hispanic or Latino of any race.

There were 1,419 households, out of which 32.2% had children under the age of 18 living with them, 47.2% were married couples living together, 18.3% had a female householder with no husband present, and 31.1% were non-families. 27.1% of all households were made up of individuals, and 14.4% had someone living alone who was 65 years of age or older.  The average household size was 2.35 and the average family size was 2.84.

In the city, the population was spread out, with 24.5% under the age of 18, 8.3% from 18 to 24, 26.0% from 25 to 44, 22.1% from 45 to 64, and 19.0% who were 65 years of age or older.  The median age was 39 years. For every 100 females, there were 87.1 males.  For every 100 females age 18 and over, there were 79.1 males.

The median income for a household in the city was $30,921, and the median income for a family was $42,917. Males had a median income of $30,536 versus $25,240 for females. The per capita income for the city was $18,993.  About 10.6% of families and 18.2% of the population were below the poverty line, including 25.0% of those under age 18 and 14.4% of those age 65 or over.

Education 
DeWitt is the center of the DeWitt School District and is home to DeWitt High School, DeWitt Middle School, DeWitt Elementary School, and Gillett Elementary School. Their mascot is the Dragons, and their school colors are blue and gold.
DeWitt High School houses grades 9 through 12. DeWitt Middle School houses grades 6 through 8, and both DeWitt Elementary and Gillett Elementary provide kindergarten through 5th grade.

Culture and contemporary life

The city contains eight listings on the National Register of Historic Places. The DeWitt Commercial Historic District contains 54 historically significant buildings, 32 of which face Courthouse Square, including the Arkansas County Courthouse-Southern District itself. The L.A. Black Rice Milling Association Inc. Office and Halliburton House preserve historical associations with prominent local officials. The DeWitt Post Office contains New Deal-era murals. Three historic bridges are also listed in the city: Maxwell Street Bridge, North Jackson Street Bridge, and the North Washington Street Bridge.

In September 2011, the feature film Mud (2013; written and directed by Jeff Nichols, starring Reese Witherspoon and Matthew McConaughey) was filmed in and around Arkansas County. The movie featured a scene filmed at DeWitt Hospital & Nursing Home.

Annual cultural events
Perhaps the most popular annual event in DeWitt is duck hunting season between November and January, a tradition dating back to the Illinois Indians who traveled south to Arkansas to hunt, popular with Arkansans and tourist hunters from across the country. 

The Arkansas County Fair has been held annually since 1938 at the Arkansas County Fairgrounds in DeWitt during mid-September.

Media

DeWitt has been served by the DeWitt Era Enterprise since 1929. Several other newspapers have been published in the city, many during the late 19th century.

Infrastructure

The primary highway in DeWitt is U.S. Route 165 (US 165), which connects the city to Stuttgart (the county seat of Arkansas County's northern district) and Little Rock, Arkansas to the north and Dumas, Arkansas and Louisiana to the south. Highway 1 (AR 1) runs along the city's eastern side, with Highway 1 Business (AR 1B) passing through downtown DeWitt. Other minor highways include AR 152 (2nd Street) and AR 130. AR 980 gives access to the DeWitt Municipal Airport, a general aviation facility.

The Great River Road, a National Scenic Byway following the Mississippi River, passes through DeWitt. It enters the city from the south on US 165 and turns onto AR 1 toward St. Charles.

Notable people

 Bobby Capps, keyboardist/vocalist for the southern rock band 38 Special, noted for vocals in concert on fan favorite "Second Chance", a song originally sung by Max Carl and first released on the album "Rock & Roll Strategy" in 1988
 George Dickey, catcher for the Boston Red Sox and Chicago White Sox
 Wayne DuMond, serial rapist and killer whose crimes and efforts to gain his freedom from prison vexed the political careers of three Arkansas governors: Bill Clinton, Jim Guy Tucker and Mike Huckabee
 Carlene Mitchell,  former assistant coach of WNBA basketball team Chicago Sky, as well as former head coach of NCAA women's basketball team, UC Santa Barbara Gauchos
 Carol Rasco, Director of the Domestic Policy Council under President Bill Clinton; advocate for disability rights, education, and children
Frank Glasgow Tinker, combat flying ace with eight victories; first American fighter pilot to down a Nazi Messerschmitt Bf-109, during Spanish Civil War

See also

References

Further reading

External links 

DeWitt Era-Enterprise
DeWitt Hospital & Nursing Home

Cities in Arkansas County, Arkansas
Cities in Arkansas
County seats in Arkansas